Tunjung may refer to:
 Tunjung language, a language of Indonesia
 Gregoria Mariska Tunjung, Indonesian badminton player